The 2008 AMF Futsal Women's World Cup, supported by the AMF, was the inaugural edition of the AMF Futsal Women's World Cup. The tournament was held in Reus, Catalonia, from 29  September to 5 October 2008. It was organized by the Catalonia Futsal Federation and there were 12 national teams in the competition.

Teams

First round

Final round

Classification 9th–12th

Classification 1st–8th

Day 4
Places 9-12

Quarter finals

Day 5
Places 11-12

Places 9-10

Places 5-8

Semifinals

Final day
Places 7-8

Places 5-6

Places 3-4

FINAL

Final standings

References

External links
Official website Reus 2008 
 Reus24: Day 1  ·  Day 2  · Day 3  · Quarter finals  · Semifinals  · Final 
AMF 

AMF Futsal Women's World Cup
International futsal competitions hosted by Catalonia
2008–09 in Spanish futsal
2008 in Catalan sport